Kenwood station may refer to:

Kenwood Depot, a former train station in Kenwood, California
47th Street (Kenwood) station, a train station in Chicago, Illinois

See also
Kenwood (disambiguation)